The 1995 AC Delco 400 was the 29th stock car race of the 1995 NASCAR Winston Cup Series and the 21st iteration of the event. The race was held on Sunday, October 22, 1995, in Rockingham, North Carolina, at North Carolina Motor Speedway, a  permanent high-banked racetrack. The race took the scheduled 393 laps to complete. On the final restart of the race with 10 to go, Bill Davis Racing driver Ward Burton would manage to defend the field to take his first career NASCAR Winston Cup Series victory and his only victory of the season. To fill out the top three, Penske Racing South driver Rusty Wallace and Roush Racing driver Mark Martin would finish second and third, respectively.

The race was marred in controversy when late in the race, a NASCAR official had mistaken a dark-colored lug-nut on championship contender Dale Earnhardt's car as missing, when in reality the lug-nut was on the car. Initially, Earnhardt was forced to suffer a one-lap penalty. However, after NASCAR had realized the mistake, NASCAR would declare an extended caution period to ensure that Earnhardt could gain his lost lap back. This decision led to extreme anger from drivers and their crews, saying that the caution had ruined their strategies and that the decision had preferred a single driver that had been a deterrent to every other driver.

In the overall driver's championship points race, second-place driver Dale Earnhardt was able to close the gap between himself and points leader Jeff Gordon by 43 points, decreasing Gordon's lead to 162 points. With only two races left in the season, Gordon was listed as the heavy favorite to win the championship.

Background 

North Carolina Speedway was opened as a flat, one-mile oval on October 31, 1965. In 1969, the track was extensively reconfigured to a high-banked, D-shaped oval just over one mile in length. In 1997, North Carolina Motor Speedway merged with Penske Motorsports, and was renamed North Carolina Speedway. Shortly thereafter, the infield was reconfigured, and competition on the infield road course, mostly by the SCCA, was discontinued. Currently, the track is home to the Fast Track High Performance Driving School.

Entry list 

 (R) denotes rookie driver.

Qualifying 
Qualifying was originally scheduled to be split into two rounds. The first round was scheduled to be held on Friday, October 20, at 2:30 PM EST. However, first-round qualifying was rained out and postponed until Saturday, October 21, at 9:30 AM EST. As a result of the rain delay, qualifying was decided to be combined into only one round. For this specific race, positions 1-38 would be decided on time, and depending on who needed it, a select amount of positions were given to cars who had not otherwise qualified but were high enough in owner's points; which was usually four. If needed, a past champion who did not qualify on either time or provisionals could use a champion's provisional, adding one more spot to the field.

Seven drivers would fail to qualify.

Full qualifying results

Race results

References 

1995 NASCAR Winston Cup Series
NASCAR races at Rockingham Speedway
October 1995 sports events in the United States
1995 in sports in North Carolina